National Tertiary Route 739, or just Route 739 (or ) is a National Road Route of Costa Rica, located in the Alajuela province.

Description
In Alajuela province the route covers San Ramón canton (San Lorenzo district), San Carlos canton (Florencia district).

References

Highways in Costa Rica